Apex Hill is a hill in Qikiqtaaluk Region, Nunavut, Canada. It is located on Baffin Island, near the community of Apex, a suburb of Iqaluit.

References
Atlas of Canada – Apex Hill, Nunavut

Mountains of Qikiqtaaluk Region
Hills of Canada